Ray Kappe (August 4, 1927 – November 21, 2019) was an American architect and educator. In 1972, he resigned his position as Founding Chair of the Department of Architecture at California State Polytechnic University, Pomona and along with a group of faculty, students and his wife, Shelly Kappe, started what eventually came to be known as the Southern California Institute of Architecture (SCI-Arc). In 2003, Kappe began working with LivingHomes to design modular homes.

Kappe remained actively involved in architectural theory and practice in his later years, particularly in the areas of sustainability and the prefabrication of residences.

Early life and education
Kappe was born in Minneapolis on August 4, 1927, the son of Romanian immigrants. He attended high school in Los Angeles. He studied for a single semester at UCLA in 1945 before being drafted in into the U.S. Army Corps of Engineers, where he served as a topographical surveying instructor.

Career
After his discharge Kappe attended the University of California, Berkeley, and earned a B.Arch. degree in 1951. He practiced architecture on his own starting in 1954, and then became one of the principals of Kahn Kappe Lotery Boccato in 1968. The firm changed names in 1978 to Kappe Lotery Boccato and in 1985, Kappe split off to form Kappe Architects Planners. 

Kappe died from respiratory failure on November 21, 2019.

Legacy
The Ray Kappe Archive is housed at the Getty Research Institute and contains all of his drawings, models, and papers, offering comprehensive coverage of his long and varied career.

In 2021, actor Will Arnett sold a custom residence based on a design by Kappe in Beverly Hills for $7.85 million.

In popular culture
The Showtime series Californication features one of Kappe's projects, the Benton House, as a major plot point in Episode Seven, "Girls Interrupted." The interior of this house is also featured on the CBS series Shark and in the movie Cruel Intentions.

Another of his projects made two brief appearances in the Sea Hunt episode, "Hit and Run," as the residence of the episode's villain. This house was also featured in the Home section of the Los Angeles Times, in an article titled, "A Boat, a Bay, and a Happy House."

References

External links
 Kappe Architects website 
 Getty.edu: Ray Kappe papers — finding aids'.
 U.S. Modernist Masters Gallery — Ray Kappe 

Modernist architects
1927 births
2019 deaths
Architects from Los Angeles
Architecture educators
Southern California Institute of Architecture faculty
California State Polytechnic University, Pomona faculty
Educators from Greater Los Angeles
California State Polytechnic University, Pomona alumni
American people of Romanian-Jewish descent
People from Pacific Palisades, California
20th-century American architects
21st-century American architects
UC Berkeley College of Environmental Design alumni